Conservatibacter is a genus of bacteria from the family of Pasteurellaceae with one known species (Conservatibacter flavescens).

References

Pasteurellales
Bacteria genera
Monotypic bacteria genera